Alejandro Miguel Galindo (born 5 March 1992) is a Guatemalan footballer who currently plays as a midfielder for Liga Nacional club Cobán Imperial. He also holds Colombian citizenship.

Club career

Atlético Juventud and Santa Fe
Born in Guatemala to a Guatemalan father and a Colombian mother, Galindo moved to Colombia with his mother when he was 10 years old. At 12, he started playing in the lower divisions of the Colombian club Independiente Santa Fe. He debuted in the professional football in Atlético Juventud, an affiliated club of Santa Fe playing in the Categoría Primera B, where he played 31 matches and scored 1 goal. He return for Independiente Santa Fe for the 2011 Categoría Primera A season, debuting on 9 March in the draw 0–0 against Bogotá F.C. in the Copa Colombia. Galindo played a total of 10 matches for Santa Fe (3 in the league and 7 in the Copa Colombia), and earned the 2012 Apertura title.

Municipal
He joined CSD Municipal from the Liga Nacional de Fútbol de Guatemala for the 2013–14 season, after almost a year without having played a game. He debuted on 9 October, in the match against Deportivo Malacateco.

International career
Galindo made his debut for Guatemala, at just 20 years of age, as a substitute in on 26 April 2012 friendly match against Paraguay. He entered in the 46th minute, but the match ended in a 0–1 defeat. He played another friendly match on 2 June 2012 against Costa Rica, where he played 79 minutes, that ended in a 1–0 victory. His first match of the 2014 FIFA World Cup qualification was on 8 June 2012, in a 2–1 defeat against Jamaica.

Career statistics

Club

International

International appearances

International goals
Scores and results list the Guatemala's goal tally first.

Honours
Santa Fe
Primera A: 2012 Apertura

Antigua
Liga Nacional de Guatemala: Apertura 2015, Apertura 2016, Apertura 2017, Clausura 2019

Cobán Imperial 
Liga Nacional de Guatemala: Apertura 2022

Source:

References

External links
 
 

1992 births
Living people
Association football midfielders
Guatemalan footballers
Guatemalan expatriate footballers
Guatemala international footballers
Independiente Santa Fe footballers
Naturalized citizens of Colombia
C.S.D. Municipal players
Antigua GFC players
Atlético Juventud footballers
Comunicaciones F.C. players
Categoría Primera A players
Categoría Primera B players
Guatemalan expatriate sportspeople in Colombia
Expatriate footballers in Colombia